Radio Republike Srpske or Radio RS is the entity-level public radio channel operated by Radio Televizija Republike Srpske (RTRS). Its headquarters are located in Banja Luka.

This radio station broadcasts a variety of programs, including news, music, talk shows and sports. The program is broadcast 24 hours per day in the Serbian language.

See also
 List of radio stations in Bosnia and Herzegovina
 RTRS
 BH Radio 1
 Federalni Radio

References

External links
Official website

Mass media in Banja Luka
Multilingual broadcasters
Publicly funded broadcasters
Radio stations established in 1993
Radio stations in Bosnia and Herzegovina
Radio Televizija Republike Srpske